Authon may refer to:

Places
Authon is the name or part of the name of several communes in France:

 Authon, Alpes-de-Haute-Provence, in the Alpes-de-Haute-Provence département
 Authon, Charente-Maritime, former commune of the Charente-Maritime département, now part of Authon-Ébéon
 Authon, Loir-et-Cher, in the Loir-et-Cher département
 Authon-du-Perche, in the Eure-et-Loir département
 Authon-Ébéon, in the Charente-Maritime département
 Authon-la-Plaine, in the Essonne département

See also

Anthon (given name)